Stavros Psarrakis (born 14 September 1939 in Pireaus) is a sailor from Greece, who represented his country at the 1968 Summer Olympics in Acapulco, Mexico as crew member in the Flying Dutchman. With helmsman George Andreadis they took the 22nd place.

References
 

Living people
1946 births
Greek male sailors (sport)
Sailors at the 1968 Summer Olympics – Flying Dutchman
Olympic sailors of Greece
Sailors (sport) from Piraeus